Amangkurat I (Amangkurat Agung; 1619–1677) was the susuhunan of the Mataram Sultanate from 1646 to 1677. He was the son of Sultan Agung of Mataram. He experienced many rebellions during his reign. He died in exile in 1677, and buried in Tegalwangi (near Tegal), hence his posthumous title, Sunan Tegalwangi or Sunan Tegalarum. He was also nicknamed as Sunan Getek, because he was wounded when suppressing the rebellion of Raden Mas Alit, his own brother.

Early reign
In 1645, Amangkurat was appointed as the monarch or leader (susuhunan) of Mataram, succeeding his father. He was then styled Susuhunan Ing Alaga. Following his coronation in 1646, he was styled Kanjeng Susuhunan Prabu Amangkurat Agung, abbreviated as Amangkurat. In Javanese, the word Amangku means "to administer", and Rat means "world", thus Amangkurat means "administering the world". He then became a king who had full power over the entire Mataram Sultanate and its vassal states. At his coronation, all royal family members swore allegiance to him.

The death of Sultan Agung of Mataram was unexpected, and there was a risk of succession disputes and chaos. To prevent succession disputes from challenging his legitimacy, Agung's son Amangkurat I (crowned with heavy military security in 1646) launched several pre-emptive strikes (assassinations, massacres and battles) to eliminate potential rivals to the throne, including many noblemen and military leaders.

Amangkurat gained the vast territory of Mataram from his father, and centralized control over his domains. Upon taking the throne, he tried to bring long-term stability to the sultanate's realm, which was considerable in size, but marred by continual rebellions. He murdered local leaders that he deemed insufficiently deferential to him, including the still-powerful noble from Surabaya, Pangeran Pekik, his father-in-law. Other victims were Tumenggung Wiraguna and Tumenggung Danupaya, who were ordered to invade the Blambangan Kingdom which had been conquered by the Kingdom of Bali in 1647, but they were murdered en route to the east. Wiraguna's entire family was then murdered on Amangkurat's orders as well. This purge led his younger brother, Prince Raden Mas Alit (patron of the Wiraguna family), to attempt to overthrow him by attacking the royal palace with the support of Islamic clerics (ulema) and a devout Muslims faction in 1648, but they were defeated and Alit was slain in battle. Two days later, Amangkurat committed a massacre of the ulema and their families (about 5,000–6,000 people) to secure his reign. They were gathered in the alun-alun (city square) to be massacred.

Amangkurat also ordered the closing of ports and destroyed ships in coastal cities to prevent them from getting too powerful from their wealth. To further his glory, the new king abandoned the Karta Palace, Sultan Agung's capital, and moved to a grander red-brick palace in Plered (formerly the palace was built of wood).

Foreign relations 
Amangkurat I established a close relationship with the Dutch East India Company (VOC) who had previously fought with his father. In 1646, he allowed the Dutch East India Company to establish trade posts in Mataram territory, while Mataram was allowed to trade in other Dutch-ruled islands. They were also known to exchange prisoners with each other. The treaty was viewed by Amangkurat  as a sign of the company's submission to Mataram rule. However, he was shocked when the Dutch East India Company conquered the Sultanate of Palembang in 1659.

Hostility between Mataram and Banten also worsened. In 1650, Cirebon was ordered to conquer Banten, but failed. Two years later, Amangkurat forbade rice and wood exports to the country. In the meantime, diplomatic relations between Mataram and Gowa (which had been established by Sultan Agung) were deteriorating. Amangkurat refused Gowa's messengers and asked Sultan Hasanuddin himself to come to Java, but the request was certainly rejected.

Conflict with crown prince
Amangkurat I was also at odds with Crown Prince Rahmat (the future Amangkurat II). The conflict began with the announcement that the position of crown prince would be transferred to Prince Singasari (another of Amangkurat I's sons). Later in 1661, Rahmat led an unsuccessful rebellion against his father. Amangkurat suppressed the entire entourage of his son's supporters but he failed in Rahmat in 1663.

The crown prince felt that his life was not safe in the court after he took his father's concubine, Rara Oyi, with the help of his maternal grandfather, Pangeran Pekik of Surabaya, making Amangkurat suspicious of a conspiracy among Surabayan factions to grab power in the capital by using Pekiks’ grandson's powerful position as the crown prince. Amangkurat sentenced his own father-in-law, Pangeran Pekik, to death, under the accusation of abducting Rara Oyi for the crown prince. Amangkurat forgave his son after forcing him to kill Rara Oyi with his own hands.

Trunajaya rebellion

By the mid-1670s dissatisfaction with the king was turning into open revolt, beginning from the recalcitrant Eastern Java and creeping inward. RM. Rahmat conspired with Panembahan Rama of Kajoran, South Klaten, who proposed a stratagem in which the crown prince financed Rama's son-in-law, Trunajaya, to begin a rebellion in the East Java. Raden Trunajaya, a prince from Madura, lead a revolt supported by itinerant fighters from faraway Makassar, led by Karaeng Galesong (supporter of Sultan Hasanuddin who had been defeated by Dutch East India Company in 1668), that captured the king's court at Mataram in mid-1677.

It is believed that a subsequent conflict occurred between Trunajaya and RM. Rahmat, causing Trunajaya not to cede power to him as planned before and even plundered the palace. RM. Rahmat who couldn't control Trunajaya was eventually in his father's side.

The king escaped to the north coast with his eldest son, the future king, leaving his younger son Pangeran Puger in Mataram. Apparently more interested in profit and revenge than in running a struggling empire, the rebel Trunajaya looted the court and withdrew to his stronghold in Kediri, East Java, leaving Puger in control of a weak court. Seizing this opportunity, Puger assumed the throne in the ruins of Plered with the title Susuhunan ing Alaga.

Death
Soon after this episode, Amangkurat fell sick in exile. According to the Babad Tanah Jawi, his death was catalyzed by poisoned coconut water given by the crown prince. Despite this, he still appointed his son as successor, but accompanied by a curse to his descendants that would become a king, except for one, would rule only for a short period. Amangkurat also made a will to his son to ask for help from the Dutch East India Company to seize the throne from Trunajaya.

Amangkurat died in the Wanayasa forest and was buried near his teacher near Tegal. Because of its fragrant soil, the village where he was buried would be known as Tegalwangi or Tegalarum. Twelve Dutch soldiers led by Oufers attended his funeral.

He was succeeded by his eldest son as susuhunan in 1677, who reigned as Amangkurat II.

See also 
 Massacre of ulema by Amangkurat I

References

Footnotes

Bibliography 
 
 
 Babad Tanah Jawi, Mulai dari Nabi Adam Sampai Tahun 1647. (transl.). 2007. Yogyakarta: Narasi.
 Moedjianto. 1987. Konsep Kekuasaan Jawa: Penerapannya oleh Raja-raja Mataram. Yogyakarta: Kanisius.
 Purwadi. 2007. Sejarah Raja-Raja Jawa. Yogyakarta: Media Ilmu.

Sultans of Mataram
Deaths by poisoning
1619 births
1677 deaths
17th-century Indonesian people